Two Small Bodies is an American 1977 two-character thriller play by Neal Bell.

Plot
A strip club hostess' two children are missing and she is questioned by a police lieutenant for days when he suspects she murdered them.

Film
The play was adapted into the 1993 film Two Small Bodies by director Beth B and starring Fred Ward and Suzy Amis.

Background
The play was inspired by the Alice Crimmins 1960s murder trial.

References

External links
Stageplays.com

1977 plays
Thriller plays
American plays adapted into films